Richard Samuel Reynolds Sr. was the founder of the U.S. Foil Company.

Early life 
Reynolds was born on August 15, 1881 in Madison County, North Carolina. He was the nephew of leading tobacco producer R.J. Reynolds and the son of Major Abraham David Reynolds (August 13, 1847 – September 1925). He married Julia Louise Parham on December 21, 1904. Reynolds was the father of Richard S. Reynolds Jr. (1909–1969), who was the founder of Reynolds & Co., a brokerage firm that merged with Dean Witter & Co. in 1978 to form Dean Witter Reynolds.

Career 
Reynolds left the University of Virginia in 1903 to join the R. J. Reynolds Tobacco Company, working for his uncle, who had founded the company.  Reynolds was in part responsible for the company's switch from the production of chewing to smoking tobacco and the launch of Camel cigarettes. In 1912, Reynolds left R.J. Reynolds to go into business for himself.

Shortly after World War I, Reynolds founded the U.S. Foil Company in Louisville, Kentucky.  Among the company's early partners were R.J. Reynolds and the British-American Tobacco Company.  The company's original business was to roll tin and lead foil for cigarette packaging. Among other innovations, Reynolds devised a moisture-preserving tobacco tin.

Later the switch to aluminum foil was made.  In 1947,  his company introduced Reynolds Wrap. It was sold around the world, it transformed food storage. Reynolds Metals was the second-largest aluminum company in the United States and the third-largest in the world. The Richmond, Virginia, company was bought by ALCOA in 2000.

References 

1881 births
1955 deaths
American manufacturing businesspeople
R. J. Reynolds Tobacco Company people
Reynolds family
People from Madison County, North Carolina